TPP Kostolac is a coal fired thermal power plant complex operated by Elektroprivreda Srbije, located on the right bank of Danube river, in Kostolac, Požarevac. It is the second largest power plant in Serbia after TPP Nikola Tesla. Within the complex, there are 4 operational units as of October 2020. It makes around 10% of the total available capacity of the electric power system of Serbia and almost 11 percent of the total electric power production in EPS's (Elektroprivreda Srbije) system.

History
The complex has 4 operational units, grouped in Kostolac A and Kostolac B. Kostolac A consists of one 100 MW unit and one 210 MW unit, commissioned in 1967 and 1980, respectively. Kostolac B comprises two 350 MW units (total of 700 MW), B1 and B2, commissioned in 1987 and 1991. In addition to electric power, TPP "Kostolac A" produces heating energy for heating of Kostolac and Požarevac.

Kostolac B3 planned
Also, additional Kostolac B3 unit is planned with installed capacity of 350 MW. For the purposes of running the new plant, expansion of an open pit mine Drmno from 9 to 12 tons of coal annually is planned. There are already existing units Kostolac A1, A2, B1 and B2 and Drmno and Cirikovac open cast mines at the site.

On 20 November 2013, Elektroprivreda Srbije, "Tеrmoеlеktranе i kopovi" Kostolac and Chinese corporation CMEC signed an agreement on construction. Authorities announced that the construction of the power plant is expected to begin by the end of 2014 and to be finished by 2019. Together with the existing blocks B1 and B2 the new plan will satisfy about 20% of Serbia's electricity needs. Zhang Chun, president and CEO of CMEC said that the new thermal power plant will have a positive impact on the environment, because it will comply with the emissions requirements of the European Union scheduled for 2018.

The project depends on financing from the China Exim Bank and unnamed commercial banks, and on a state guarantee from the Government of Serbia for these loans. The 2014 Serbian state budget allocates two guarantees for the project – US$107 million for unnamed commercial banks and US$608 million for the China Exim Bank.  Total value of the project amounts to US$715.6 million.

Ownership
Company "Tеrmoеlеktranе i kopovi" Kostolac is a subsidiary of Elektroprivreda Srbije which is 100% owned by the state of Serbia.

Controversial issues about Kostolac B3

Inadequate environmental impact assessment
NGOs are of the opinion that the Environmental impact assessment for the TPP Kostolac B3 is inadequate since it excludes the expansion of the Drmno open-cast mine, does not mention expected levels of emissions to air from heavy metals and does not consider alternative locations or alternative technologies. There is also no mentioning of transboundary impacts even though the site is just around 15 km from the Romanian border and even nearer to the River Danube. NGOs also stress that data sources cited in the study for environmental and health information are outdated (from 2006) and very limited.

On June the 2nd 2014 Serbian NGO CEKOR (Centre for Ecology and Sustainable Development) submitted a formal complaint in front of the Serbian national administrative court against the government’s decision to approve the Environmental Impact Assessment study for the construction of a new unit at the TPP Kostolac B. The complaint, in which the CEKOR exposes failings in the EIA process, is the first of its kind to reach Serbian courts.

Absence of the public procurement procedure
The signing of a contract with CMEC on 20 November 2013 was done without public tender. This is justified by the Serbian government on the basis of Public procurement act, article 2, which says that projects signed under inter-state agreements with other states do not need tender processes. Given the fact that Serbia has the obligation of aligning itself with the EU legislation, the question arises if the law is in accordance with the EU public procurement and state aid legislation.

Events

2014 Floods
Floods in May 2014 threatened to reach Kostolac B thermo power plant, however plant workers, fire-fighters and civilian volunteers managed to contain the water by building embankments. Given the fact that during floods RB Kolubara suffered huge damages, losing Kostolac would mean another big hit for Serbia’s energy production. Environmental impact assessment for TPP Kostolac B3 doesn’t assess the vulnerability of the new power plant to flooding.

See also
 Kostolac coal mine
 List of power stations in Serbia

References

Elektroprivreda Srbije
Coal-fired power stations in Serbia
Electric power companies of Serbia
Government-owned companies of Serbia
Companies based in Požarevac